Muhammad Syafril Lestaluhu (born 12 April 1998) is an Indonesian professional footballer who plays as a defensive midfielder for Liga 2 club Kalteng Putra.

Club career

Persib Bandung
He was signed for Persib Bandung to play in Liga 1 in the 2021 season. Syafril made his first-team debut on 29 January 2022 in a match against Persikabo 1973 as a substitute for Beckham Putra in the 90+3rd minute at the Ngurah Rai Stadium, Denpasar.

Persikabo 1973
Syafril was signed for Persikabo 1973 to play in Liga 1 in the 2022–23 season.

Career statistics

Club

Notes

References

External links
 Syafril Lestaluhu at Soccerway
 Syafril Lestaluhu at Liga Indonesia

1998 births
Living people
Indonesian footballers
Persib Bandung players
Association football midfielders
People from Tulehu
21st-century Indonesian people